Desert Lake is an unincorporated community in Kern County, California.

Desert Lake's ZIP code is 93516.

References

Populated places in the Mojave Desert
Unincorporated communities in Kern County, California
Unincorporated communities in California